Fifield is an unincorporated community located in the town of Fifield, Price County, Wisconsin, United States. Fifield has a post office with ZIP code 54524.

Images

References

Unincorporated communities in Price County, Wisconsin
Unincorporated communities in Wisconsin